Mashed potato or mashed potatoes (American and Canadian English), colloquially known as mash (British English), is a dish made by mashing boiled or steamed potatoes, usually with added milk, butter, salt and pepper. It is generally served as a side dish to meat or vegetables. Roughly mashed potatoes are sometimes called smashed potatoes. Dehydrated instant mashed potatoes and frozen mashed potatoes are available. Mashed potatoes are an ingredient in other dishes, such as dumplings and gnocchi.

Ingredients
Most authors recommend the use of "floury" potatoes with a high ratio of amylose in their starch to achieve a fluffy, creamy consistency and appearance. The best-known floury varieties are King Edward, golden wonder, and red rascal in Britain and the Russet in North America. However, some recipes use "waxy" potatoes containing more amylopectin in their starch for a different texture or look; for instance, one pounded mashed potato dish from Yunnan cuisine (in southwestern China), which uses waxy potatoes to achieve a chewy, sticky texture.

Butter, milk or cream, salt, and pepper are usually added. Many other seasonings may also be used, including herbs (notably parsley and chives), spices (notably nutmeg), garlic, cheese, bacon, sour cream, crisp onion or spring onion, caramelized onion, and mustard.

One French variation adds egg yolk for pommes duchesse or Duchess potatoes; piped through a pastry tube into wavy ribbons and rosettes, brushed with butter and lightly browned. Some French recipes for pomme purée (potato puree) use up to one part butter for every two parts potato. In low-calorie or non-dairy variations, milk, cream and butter may be replaced by soup stock or broth. 

Aloo bharta, an Indian sub-continent variation, uses chopped onions, mustard (oil, paste or seeds), chili pepper, coriander leaves and other spices. Alu pitika is a popular variation of aloo bharta in Assam, that may occasionally omit mustard and other spices. Alu pitika using roasted and smoked potatoes is especially consumed in winters.

History

An early recipe is found in Hannah Glasse's The Art of Cookery, in 1747. Her recipe mashed them in a saucepan with milk, salt, and butter.

Culinary uses

Mashed potato can be served as a side dish. In the British Isles, sausages served with mashed potatoes are known as bangers and mash. Mashed potato can be an ingredient of various other dishes, including shepherd's and cottage pie, Orkney clapshot, pierogi, colcannon, dumplings, potato pancakes, potato croquettes and gnocchi. Particularly runny mashed potatoes are called mousseline potatoes.

In the United Kingdom, cold mashed potato can be mixed with fresh eggs and then fried until crisp to produce a potato cake. This dish is thought to have originated in Cornwall and is a popular breakfast item. When instead combined with meat and other leftover vegetables, the fried dish is known as bubble and squeak.

Mashed potatoes may be eaten with gravy, typically meat gravy, though vegetable gravy is becoming more common as the vegetarian and vegan trends see a rise in popularity.

A potato masher can be used to mash the potatoes. A potato ricer produces a uniform, lump-free, mash.

In India mashed potatoes made with spices, fried or not, are called chaukha. Chaukha is used in samosas in India and with littee specially in Bihar.

See also

 Aligot
 Champ
 Fufu
 Hachis Parmentier
 Hutspot
 List of Irish dishes
 List of potato dishes
 Mince and tatties
 Perkedel

References

External links

Potato dishes
British cuisine
Irish cuisine
Dutch cuisine
Luxembourgian cuisine
German cuisine
Swedish cuisine
Sámi cuisine
Danish cuisine
Norwegian cuisine
Finnish cuisine
Lithuanian cuisine
Indian cuisine
Australian cuisine
New Zealand cuisine
Thanksgiving food